Zainab Adamu Bulkachuwa, OFR (born March 1950) is a Nigerian judge and former President of the Nigerian courts of appeal

She is the first Female to be the President of the Nigerian court of Appeal.

Early life
Justice Zainab Adamu Bulkacha OFR (Rtd) was born on 6th March, 1950 to Alhaji Abubakar Gidado El-Nafaty and Hajiya Aishatu Dudu El-Nafaty. An indigene of Nafada Local Government Area of Gombe State.

Education
She began her Primary Education at Tudun Wada Primary School in Kaduna and also attended Senior Primary School, in Kaduna - Kaduna State between 1957 in 1963, where she acquired her First School Leaving Certificate in 1963. She later enrolled at Queen Elizabeth School in Ilorin - Kwara State where she obtained her West African School Certificate (WASC) in 1968. Honourable Justice Zainab Bulkachuwa proceeded to Abdullahi Bayero College Kano for her GCE ‘A’ Levels between 1971 and 1972 and in 1975 she obtained her LL.B (Hons) from Ahmadu Bello University, Zaria, Kaduna State. She then proceeded to the Nigerian Law School Bwari - Federal Capital Territory, Abuja between 1975 and 1976.

Marital life 
The former president court of appeal justice Zainab has married twice after the death of her first husband as she disclosed at valedictory court session done in her honour by the River state Governor Nyesom Wike. She is currently married to a former Senator who is also a member of APC, Senator Adamu Muhammad bulkachukwu Justice Zainab's eldest son, Aliyu Haidar Abubakar is a youth activist based in Abuja contested for Gombe Governorship election in 2018

Call to the bar
She was Call to the bar in 1976 and was appointed to the bench of the Nigerian courts of appeals as Justice in 1998.
Prior to that appointment, she was a Judge at the High Court of Bauchi State.
She presided over the Sokoto State governorship election petition of 2007 and the suit in which Timipre Sylva's petition challenged the nomination of Seriake Dickson as the State flag-bearer of the Peoples' Democratic Party, a case that was dismissed by the Supreme Court of Nigeria.
On April 17, 2014, she was appointed as the first female President of the Nigerian courts of appeals by President Goodluck Ebele Jonathan, sworn-in by Aloma Mariam Mukhtar, A former Chief Justice of Nigeria and who coincidentally is first female Chief Justice of the Federal Republic of Nigeria.

Membership
Member, Nigerian Bar Association
Member, International Bar Association
Member, Nigerian Body of Benchers

Retirement 
Zainab Adamu Bulkachuwa retired from active service on her 70th birthday, 6th march 2020 and a Valedictory Court Session In her Honor was held on the 5th of march 2020

References

1950 births
Living people
Nigerian jurists
People from Gombe State